Eamonn Doran's (formerly known as The Rock Garden) was a bar and music venue located in Dublin's Temple Bar. The venue also had an adjacent pizza parlour which was part-owned by Huey Morgan of the Fun Lovin' Criminals.

The Cranberries, Mundy, Paddy Casey, Damien Dempsey, Joy Zipper, Republic Of Loose started off playing there. In 1993, Radiohead played their first-ever Irish gig at the venue. TFI Friday broadcast its 2000 St. Patrick's Day episode from the venue, where Chris Evans interviewed members of U2, The Corrs and actor James Nesbitt.

References 

Music venues in Dublin (city)